Radio Bam (or Bam Radio) was a Sirius XM radio station hosted by professional skateboarder and Jackass cast member Bam Margera that aired on Mondays at 7 pm, straight after The Jason Ellis Show. The show's supporting cast was originally made up of Margera's fellow CKY crew members Brandon DiCamillo and Brandon Novak, who appeared on most episodes of the show's early years, with frequent guest appearances from Ryan Dunn, Rake Yohn and Chris Raab, as well as Bam's parents April Margera and Phil Margera, uncle Don Vito, and occasional appearances from the Jackass crew.

A recurring feature on the show was DiCamillo's freestyle raps which often poked fun at Rake by insinuating he was gay and the show frequently came under fire for its use of sexist and homophobic language. DiCamillo would also spend entire shows impersonating Rake for episodes where he was not present and the crew would often infuriate Rake by giving out his phone number live on air leading to hundreds of messages being left on his voicemail. The show would often feature lengthy discussions about Novak's most recent sexual conquests and Bam would also take phone calls from listeners calling up to insult the show or the crew in order to mock them on air.

The first two years of the show ran concurrently with Margera's MTV show Viva La Bam and episodes occasionally involved Margera and the crew discussing incidents from previous shows or plans for future episodes. In later years, Bam gradually lost touch with the CKY crew and the show then started to focus on Bam's other friends Chad I Ginsburg, Brandon Novak, and Joe Frantz, with occasional appearances from Dunn and Bam's brother Jess Margera.

On one occasion of Radio Bam, Margera left the show early after the arrest of his uncle Don Vito, saying "Fuck America", and saying he would run to Kazakhstan to "get away from this fucked up ass country". For one episode in 2009, Bam spent the entire hour talking with Ginsburg about his recent stint in rehab for alcohol abuse. On June 20, 2011, a special tribute episode was aired in memory of Ryan Dunn, who died early Monday morning, airing the best moments with Dunn. 

On episode #120, Radio Bam was taken off the air after a conversation got out of control. On episode #143, Brandon Novak was kicked out of Bam's studio and sent home to Baltimore, Maryland, after they found drugs on him.

Since February 18, 2013, there have been no new episodes of the show, leading to the belief the show had been canceled. This was later confirmed by Jess Margera on the official CKY band website.

Key presenters
Bam Margera (2004–2013)
Jess Margera (2004–2008; 2009–2013 guest)
Brandon DiCamillo (2004–2007)
Brandon Novak (2004–2013)
Joe Frantz (2004–2011; 2011 guest)
Rake Yohn (2004–2007)
Chad I Ginsburg (2004–2006 guest) (operated soundboard 2007–2012)

Guests
Ryan Dunn
Chris Raab
Phil Margera and April Margera
Ville Valo
Don Vito
Missy Margera
Deron Miller
Tony Hawk
Shitbirdz
Ryan Gee
Steve-O
Johnny Knoxville
Preston Lacy
Chris Pontius
Tammy Palumbo
Ryan Cleveland

Main crew departs
After Margera had multiple falling outs with members of the original CKY crew, the shows lineup became more about Margera and less about the original crew. He continued to feature new guest hosts post-CKY crew. These Included:

Brandon Novak
Chad I Ginsburg
Geoff "Red Mohawk"
Louie Kovatch
Production 13
Alex Flamsteed

Reboot 
On June 5, 2022, Bam's brother Jess announced that a new Radio Bam episode was being filmed. It will be hosted by Bam, Jess, and Chad I Ginsburg.

References

2004 radio programme debuts
American comedy radio programs
American talk radio programs
Sirius Satellite Radio
Skateboarding mass media